Kamimura (written: 上村 or 神村) is a Japanese surname. Notable people with the surname include:

, Japanese kickboxer
, Imperial Japanese Navy admiral
, Japanese voice actress
, Japanese manga artist
, Japanese animator
, Japanese footballer
, Japanese shogi player
, Japanese footballer

Japanese-language surnames